Gokulananda Mahapatra (24 May 1922 – 10 July 2013) was an Indian scientist and science fiction writer, who popularized science in the Odia language. Mahapatra has authored over 95 science fiction and children science books.
Some of his notable contributions are Krutrima Upagraha, Prithibi bahare Manisha, Chandra ra Mrutyu, Nishabda Godhuli, Madam Curie and Nila Chakra Bala Sapare. He was the founding member of Orissa Bigyana Prachar Samhiti with the objective of making science popular in the state of Orissa. He received Orissa Sahitya Akademy Award for his book E juga ra sreshtha abiskara.

Early life and career 
Mahapatra was born in Bhadrak, Odisha. He went on to do MSc from the University of Calcutta and was honored with PhD from the Utkal University. He also pursued FIC (Fellow in Chemistry) degree at Brandeis University (Boston, MA). He retired as the Head of the Department of Ravenshaw University.

Honours and awards 
Mahapatra was awarded the Kalinga Samman in 2011, the Orissa Sahitya Akademy Award in 1986, and R K Parija Samman Saala Samman for his contribution to science literature in Odia.

Publications

Science fiction 
 Pruthibi bahare manisha
 Krutrima Upagraha
 Chandrara Mrutyu
 Nishabda Godhuli
 Sunara Odisha
 Mrutyu eka matrutwa ra
 Nishchala pruthibi
 Mrutyu rashmi

Stories 
 Udanta thalia
 Chaturtha parisara
 Bigyana bichitra
 Bigyanara srestha abiskara
 E jugara srestha abiskara

References 

1922 births
2013 deaths
People from Bhadrak
Scientists from Odisha
Odia-language writers
Odia novelists
Indian science fiction writers
Novelists from Odisha
Recipients of the Odisha Sahitya Akademi Award
20th-century Indian novelists
21st-century Indian novelists